Aliasworlds Entertainment is a casual game developer based in Minsk, Belarus. The company was founded in 2001 and released its first game, Gold Sprinter, in 2002.

Games developed

Snowy game series
Aliasworlds Entertainment is known for the "Snowy" series of games that star Snowy the white polar bear. Much like Nintendo's Super Mario Bros. franchise, Snowy appears in games that span a variety of different genres including restaurant management and side-scrolling platformer. The "Snowy" game series is published by Alawar Entertainment.

Other games
Gold Sprinter (Alawar Entertainment) (2002)
Turbo Pizza (Oberon Media) (2007)
The Apprentice Los Angeles (Legacy Interactive) (2007)
Turbo Subs (Oberon Media) (2008)
Cooking Dash (PlayFirst) (2008)
Turbo Fiesta (Oberon Media) (2008)
Ranch Rush (FreshGames) (2008)
Cooking Dash: Dinertown Studios (PlayFirst) (2009)
Gemini Lost (PlayFirst) (2009)
The Fifth Gate (PlayFirst) (2010)
Ranch Rush 2 (FreshGames) (2010)
Cooking Dash 3: Thrills and Spills (PlayFirst) (2010)
My Farm Life (Alawar Entertainment) (2011)
My Farm Life 2 (Alawar Entertainment) (2011)
Kingdom Chronicles (2012)
Solitaire Perfect Match (2014)
Kingdom Chronicles 2 (2015)
Jigsaw Puzzle Club (2017)

References

External links

Companies based in Minsk
Casual games
Video game development companies
Video game companies of Belarus
Video game companies established in 2001
2001 establishments in Belarus